Selo pri Pancah (in older sources also Sela pri Pancih) is a small settlement in the City Municipality of Ljubljana in central Slovenia. It lies in the hills southeast of the capital Ljubljana. The area is part of the traditional region of Lower Carniola and is now included with the rest of the municipality in the Central Slovenia Statistical Region.

Mass graves

Selo pri Pancah is the site of 11 known mass graves associated with the Second World War. They contain the remains of Slovene civilians that were accused of spying and were murdered by the Partisans in spring 1942. The Vodice 1–10 mass graves are located in the woods northeast of the village. The Cirje 1 Mass Grave, also known as Miha's Hill Mass Grave, is located on the slope of Miha's Hill on the left bank of the Pance River.

References

External links

Selo pri Pancah on Geopedia

Populated places in the City Municipality of Ljubljana
Sostro District